Frode Hermann Syvertsen (born 14 January 1963) is a Norwegian speed skater, born in Askøy. He competed at the 1988 Winter Olympics in Calgary.

He placed third in the all-round national championships in 1987, 1988 and 1989.

References

External links
 

1963 births
Living people
People from Askøy
Norwegian male speed skaters
Olympic speed skaters of Norway
Speed skaters at the 1988 Winter Olympics
Sportspeople from Vestland